Flames is a 2018 Indian Hindi-language coming-of-age romantic drama web series produced by The Viral Fever (TVF). It was directed by Apoorv Singh Karki and Divyanshu Malhotra, starring Ritvik Sahore and Tanya Maniktala in the lead roles. Set in a tuition center in west Delhi, the story follows the lives of two students. Its first season premiered in 2018, while the second was released on October 18, 2019. The third season was dropped in October 2022.

Story 
The series revolves around two teenagers, Rajat, also known as Rajjo (Ritvik Sahore), Ishita (Tanya Maniktala), who fall in love with each other and simultaneously prepare for their examinations.

Cast 

 Ritvik Sahore
 Tanya Maniktala
 Sunakshi Grover
 Shivam Kakar
 Deepesh Sumitra Jagdish

Reception 
Pragya Jha of ABP News stated "Flames season 3 is the right combination of friendship, passion, and emotions, highlighted by a lot of real teenage problems."

A reviewer for The Times of India gave 3 stars and stated "Overall, Flames 3 has its heart in the right place, just like its predecessors. A few scenes stand out, particularly the heartfelt conversations between Rajjo and Ishita, making these five episodes (roughly 30 minutes) a perfect blend of friendship, romance, and emotions."

Ganesh Aaglave of Firstpost stated "On the whole, Flames season 3 will make you emotional, bring back nostalgic memories and leave a huge smile on your face at the end."

Moumita Bhattacharjee of Latestly gave season 3, a rating of 1.5 of 5 and stated "Sometimes a few series don't have enough material to stay as charming as ever. Flames season 3 is unfortunately going on the same path, despite its likeable set of actors."

References

External links 

 
 Flames on NDTV

Hindi-language web series
Indian drama web series
Indian comedy web series